Julius Kipruto Kuto (born 1984) is a male long-distance runner from Kenya. His personal best is 2:12:23 achieved at 2010 Hannover Marathon.

Achievements

External links

1984 births
Living people
Kenyan male long-distance runners